Dr. Danladi Abdullahi Sankara (born 25 November 1954) is a Nigerian politician who is Senator for the Jigawa North-West constituency of Jigawa State, Nigeria. Danladi is a member of the All Progressives Congress (APC).

Early political career
In November 2001, Danladi was the National Ex Officio member of the People's Democratic Party (PDP) and Chairman of the Elders Committee of the Party in Jigawa State.
Sankara was a contender for the 2003 Senatorial seat on the PDP platform, but was defeated by Dalha Danzomo of the All Nigeria People's Party (ANPP) -- who was supported by the Jigawa State Governor, then ANPP member Alhaji Saminu Turaki.

Turaki changed his party affiliation and won the next election as Senator for Jigawa North-West on the PDP ticket.

Sankara was elected as PDP vice-chairman in charge of the Northwest on 4 March 2008; he resigned on 24 December 2010 in order to compete in the Senatorial election for Jigawa Northwest.

Senate election

The PDP promoted Danladi's candidacy to represent the party over incumbent Ibrahim Saminu Turaki, who defected to the Action Congress of Nigeria (ACN).
After winning the primaries, Sankara received 195,412 votes in the general election, defeating Turaki (148,595 votes), Muhammad D. Alkali of the Congress for Progressive Change (CPC) (42,237 votes), and Muhammad Nasiru Kiri of the All Nigeria Peoples Party (ANPP) (20,744 votes).
Turaki filed a complaint that the votes had been tampered with in two of the twelve local government areas, threatening to challenge the result in court. Turaki's appeal would be dismissed, citing that his case "lacked merit".

Awards and honours
 Doctor of Philosophy (PhD), Degree in Public Administration (HONORIS CAUSA).
 Senior Fellow Institute of Professional Managers and Administration (IPMA).
 Dallatun Ringim, Ringim Emirate council, Jigawa State.

References

Jigawa State
Living people
Peoples Democratic Party members of the Senate (Nigeria)
1954 births